Arokpa (also spelled Ahorokpa) is a coastal village in south-western Ivory Coast. It is in the sub-prefecture of Sassandra, Sassandra Department, Gbôklé Region, Bas-Sassandra District.

Arokpa was a commune until March 2012, when it became one of 1126 communes nationwide that were abolished.

Notes

Former communes of Ivory Coast
Populated places in Bas-Sassandra District
Populated places in Gbôklé